Yin Mingshan (born 1938 in Chongqing, Sichuan) is a Chinese businessman. He was the chairman of Lifan Industrial Corporation, vice chairman of the Chinese civil association and the Chamber of Commerce, president of the Chinese motorcycle manufacturers. Upon the arrival of economic reforms in China and the opening up to first provincial-level officials of the Central Committee of the Communist Party of China, he took the leadership of the country's private entrepreneurs. According to Hurun Report's China Rich List 2013, he was the 335th richest person in China.

Early life
During the Cultural Revolution in China, Yin spent nine and a half months as a punishment for his capitalistic tendencies. After his release he joined a publishing house.

Lifan Group
In 1992, Yin Mingshan invested 200,000 yuan to found a motorcycle workshop which would become today's Lifan Group.

In 2007, the Lifan Group had realised sales of 12.16 billion yuan, with an engine production and sales volume of 3.06 million to Taiwan. With those exports worth US$409.6 million, the company had reached the country's top position among privately owned firms.

Awards and charities
Since 1992, Yin has donated a total of 6,413 million to the community of Lifan. From 1994 to 2003, Yin Mingshan was awarded several "Outstanding Entrepreneur" titles for establishing 10 high-tech zones in Chongqing.

Other awards include:
 1999: "Re-Employment Star"
 2000
 "Bauhinia Cup of Entrepreneurs" honorary title of the year by Hong Kong Polytechnic University, the National Association of Industry and Commerce;
 Chinese General Chamber of Commerce award 
 2001
 "Revitalization of Chongqing Contribution Award Winning Glory"
 The Central Committee of the Communist Party of China United Front and China Association for Promoting the Guangcai Programme awarded an honourable cause Medal
 2002
 April: For "outstanding contributions and quality management" Yin won the "2002 Outstanding Contribution to the National Quality Management Award"
 December: The National Association of Industry and Commerce, the China Federation of Trade Unions jointly awarded the "Best Care for Employees of Private Entrepreneurs" title and moreover the CPC Central Committee United Front Work Department of Five ministries awarded him the title of "Outstanding Builder of the Socialist Cause with Chinese Characteristics". 
 2005: Yin Mingshan was awarded the "China Charity Award" by the Ministry of Civil Affairs and China Charity Federation, becoming the only winner among the Chongqing municipal entrepreneurs.

On 28 December 2007, Yin Mingshan became chairman of the "Glory of China's Top 10 Personalities."

Yin Mingshan was repeatedly met and praised by party and state leaders Hu Jintao, Wu Bangguo, Wen Jiabao, Wu Yi, Li Peng and Zhu Rongji.

References

Businesspeople from Chongqing
1938 births
Living people
Chinese founders of automobile manufacturers
Chinese company founders
Chinese football chairmen and investors
Lifan Group people